Baihar is a town and a Nagar panchayat in Balaghat district in the state of Madhya Pradesh, India. Baihar is famous for various places like Joda Temple, Siyarpath Babamandi and Dhaba temple, also nearest City to Kanha Tiger reserve by Mukki Gate.

There are a total of 2,15,262 voters in the seat, which includes 1,06,746 voters, and 1,08,515 voters. In the 2018 Madhya Pradesh elections, Baihar recorded a voter turnout of 80.08%.

Geography
It has an average elevation of 567 metres (1,860 feet).

Demographics
In 2011, the India census, Baihar is a Nagar Panchayat city in district of Balaghat, Madhya Pradesh. The Baihar city is divided into 15 wards for which elections are held every 5 years. The Baihar Nagar Panchayat has population of 16,650 of which 8,334 are males while 8,316 are females as per report released by Census India 2011.

Population of children with age of 0-6 is 2030 which is 12.19% of total population of Baihar (NP). In Baihar Nagar Panchayat, the female sex ratio is of 998 against state average of 931. Moreover, the child sex ratio in Baihar is around 969 compared to Madhya Pradesh state average of 918. Literacy rate of Baihar city is 82.85%, higher than state average of 69.32%. In Baihar, male literacy is around 89.54% while female literacy rate is 76.18%.

Baihar Nagar Panchayat has total administration over 3,693 houses to which it supplies basic amenities like water and sewerage. It is also authorize to build roads within Nagar Panchayat limits and impose taxes on properties coming under its jurisdiction.

Educational institutions
 Govt. Model H.S School
 Govt. Excellence H.S. School
 Vivekanand H.S School
 Vivek Jyoti H.S. School
 Little Kingdom School
 Jyoti Montessori School
 Chakraborty Public H.S. School 
 BITS

References

External links 
 

Cities and towns in Balaghat district